Gronkowski (feminine: Gronkowska, plural: Gronkowscy) is a surname of Polish language origin. It may refer to:

People
 A family of American sportspeople:
 Ignatius Gronkowski (1897–1981), cyclist and great-grandfather of the following, all brothers and NFL American football players:
 Dan Gronkowski (born 1985), former tight end
 Chris Gronkowski (born 1986), former fullback
 Rob Gronkowski (born 1989), former tight end and the best-known member of the family
 Glenn Gronkowski (born 1993), former fullback
 Bruno Gröning (1906-1959), German mystic, born Bruno Grönkowski
 Henning Gronkowski /de/ (born 1988), German actor
 Joanna Rawik primo voto Gronkowska /pl/ (born 1934), Polish singer and actrees
 Stanisław Gronkowski (1922–2004), Polish actor

Other
 Gronkowski (horse) (born 2015), thoroughbred racehorse

See also
 
 Gronków

Polish-language surnames